Justin Ritter (born September 28, 1987), known professionally as SwizZz, is an American rapper and songwriter. He is best known for significantly collaborating with childhood friend Hopsin, and being signed to their record label Funk Volume, which was founded by Hopsin himself. He has released various singles and released two mixtapes including Haywire with Hopsin, and Good Morning SwizZzle.

Early life 
SwizZz initially met Hopsin in high school, where they were classmates and became close friends. After high school SwizZz got accepted into the University of California at Irvine, but after two years he decided to put his education on hold, while he would pursue a career in music. He was having a hard time figuring out what he wanted to major in, and he could not find anything he was passionate about in school.

Musical career

2009–2012: Forming Funk Volume and Good Morning SwizZzle 
In 2009, Hopsin founded his own independent record label, Funk Volume, with Damien Ritter. SwizZz, who is Damien Ritter's younger brother became the first artist to be signed to Funk Volume. Shortly after launching Funk Volume, Hopsin and SwizZz released a collaborative mixtape titled Haywire on June 18, 2009 to promote the label. Funk Volume originally wanted to sell it for retail sale, but were unable due to Hopsin still being contracted by Ruthless Records at the time. On mixtape website DatPiff, it has been certified Gold for being downloaded over 100,000 times, and it was later made available for purchase for digital download on iTunes and Amazon.com.

SwizZz was featured on three songs from Hopsin's second studio album Raw (2010). The music video for their collaboration, "How Do You Like Me Now" was released on February 25, 2011. Following that he went on the I Am RAW 30-date tour with Hopsin in support of Raw and in promotion of his upcoming mixtape. On June 25, 2011, SwizZz released his debut solo mixtape Good Morning SwizZzle, along with saying his debut album tentatively titled, Rock, Paper, SwizZzors would be released in 2012. On December 11, 2011, Funk Volume released a song "Funk Volume 2012", featuring Hopsin, SwizZz, and new Funk Volume signee Dizzy Wright.

In April 2012, SwizZz  released a music video for "Crank". He was featured on Stevie Stone's "Raw Talk" along with Hopsin, from his 2012 album Rolling Stone. He was also the only member of Funk Volume, to be featured on Dizzy Wright's debut studio album SmokeOut Conversations (2012). He was also featured on Dizzy Wright's "Independent Living", which also featured Hopsin.

2012–2015: Touring with Funk Volume 
Throughout late 2012, SwizZz toured internationally with Hopsin, Dizzy Wright, Jarren Benton and DJ Hoppa on the Funk Volume 2012 Tour. Their concert tour included 44 shows in 50 days, and was the subject of a documentary released on November 11, 2013. On January 24, 2013, Funk Volume released the music video for "Funk Volume 2013" featuring the entire roster; Hopsin, Dizzy Wright, SwizZz, Jarren Benton, and DJ Hoppa. On June 11, 2013, the music video was released for "Go Off" by Jarren Benton featuring Hopsin and SwizZz, the third single from his debut studio album My Grandma's Basement. Three days later, SwizZz released a remix to "Versace" titled "Bukkake". Following the release of Benton's album, Funk Volume revealed Dizzy Wright's EP, The Second Agreement and SwizZz debut album would be the label's next two releases, not including Hopsin's third studio album Knock Madness.

On August 1, 2013, SwizZz premiered his debut solo single, the self-produced "Zoom In", along with its music video. HipHopDX profiled the song saying, "SwizZz provides an introspective look into his current mindset and outlook. SwizZz is grinding now, seemingly more focused than ever, and this type of dedication and output will ensure he doesn't get slept-on for much longer." The song was then released to retail sale as a digital download on August 9, 2013. On August 12, 2013, Dizzy Wright released the music video to the SwizZz-featuring "The Flavor", from his mixtape The Golden Age. SwizZz was then featured on "Jungle Bash" from Hopsin's third studio album Knock Madness.

In November 2013, SwizZz stated that his debut studio album would be released in early 2014. He commented on the delay saying, "Once you get your head and your mind right and your personal life situated, that’s what’s next. It’s like, how are you going to make music or try to present an image or something like that when you don’t even know who you are as a person? That’s the main battle that I was dealing with—just getting my mind right."

2016–present: Funk Volume's break up, hiatus, and various singles
In April 2016, SwizZz posted on Facebook that he will be releasing music after a long hiatus.

On May 13, 2016, SwizZz released the single "Extra". One week later, he released a single tilted, "Automatic" as a response to Hopsin's track, Ill Mind of Hopsin 8. In his response, he talked about his side of the story of Funk Volume's breakup, while dissing Hopsin and defending his brother Dame at the same time. SwizZz's response track was produced by himself and DJ Hoppa. He later went on to release various singles throughout 2016-2020.

Influences 
SwizZz has said he is inspired by all types of music, from hip-hop and alternative rock, to trance and R&B. Some of his favorite artists include Jay-Z, Tupac Shakur, Eminem, DMX, 50 Cent, Taking Back Sunday, The Used, and Circa Survive.

Discography

Mixtapes

Extended plays

Singles

As lead artist

As featured artist

Guest appearances

References

External links 

1987 births
African-American male rappers
Funk Volume artists
Living people
Rappers from California
Underground rappers
University of California, Irvine alumni
21st-century American rappers
21st-century American male musicians
21st-century African-American musicians
20th-century African-American people